Stephen Henry Weyman (November 20, 1922 – June 10, 1997) was a Canadian paediatrician and politician. He served in the Legislative Assembly of New Brunswick from 1966 to 1967 as member of the Liberal party.

Descendants 
Stephen's grandson, Stephen Weyman (May 13, 1981-)  co-founded a company with his partner, Maria Weyman. Together, they own WeyMedia: a personal finance company who creates content and fintech products for Canadian consumers. Based in Dieppe, New Brunswick, they operate two Canadian resources: MoneyGenius and creditcardGenius.

References

1922 births
1997 deaths
New Brunswick Liberal Association MLAs
Politicians from Saint John, New Brunswick